is a Japanese voice actress from Gotō Islands, Nagasaki Prefecture. She is a member of the idol voice acting unit One Little Kiss. She is affiliated with Mausu Promotion.

Career
Her major voice roles include Chiisana Ojisan as Watashi and Barakamon as Miwa Yamamura. Aside from being a voice performer in the TV anime series Barakamon, she is also the dialect supervisor of the said anime. She is a member of the idol voice acting unit One Little Kiss along with fellow voice actresses Konomi Fujimura, Haruka Mikami, and Chisato Mori. From April 2014, she is affiliated with Mausu Promotion.

Filmography

Television animation
Kids on the Slope (2012), Kaoru Nishimi (young), Tokie
Chiisana Ojisan (2012), Watashi (me)
Chanpon (2014), Nyamen
Barakamon (2014), Miwa Yamamura
Saki: The Nationals (2014), Okisuke Mikuni
The Seven Deadly Sins (2014), Ellen
Chaos Dragon (2015), Mashiro Sagura
Rolling Girls (2015), Yukari Otonashi
Seiyu's Life! (2015), Aoi Konno
Seraph of the End (2015), Chess Belle
Seraph of the End: Battle in Nagoya (2015), Chess Belle
Show By Rock!! (2015), Kittsun
Grimgar of Fantasy and Ash (2016), Sassa
High School Fleet (2016) as Shima Tateishi
Ojisan to Marshmallow (2016), Junior at Marshmallow Factory
Scorching Ping Pong Girls (2016), Zakuro Zashikiwarashi
Princess Principal (2017), Chise (ep. 1, 4 - )
Trickster (2017), Yuuko Nagashima
School Babysitters (2018), Kotarō Kashima
Maesetsu! (2020), Kanae Kanenari

Film animation
High School Fleet: The Movie (2020) as Shima Tateishi
Princess Principal: Crown Handler (2021) as Chise

Games
Totemo E Mahjong (2012), Asagiri Mashiro
Blue Sky Galleon (2013), Heru
Totemo E Mahjong Plus (2014), Asagiri Mashiro
Apprentice Witch and Fluffy Friends (2015), Kaede
Idol Incidents (2015), Viramain Kosasa
Rainbow Run Girls (2015), Kanna Tachibana
Sid Story (2016),  Brahe
King's Raid (2018),  Rephy

Dubbing
Sinister (2013), Ashley Oswalt - film
Transformers: Prime, Miko Nakadai, Dago R, Dago F - American cartoon series

References

External links
 Official Agency Profile 
 

Japanese voice actresses
Living people
Voice actresses from Nagasaki Prefecture
1988 births
Mausu Promotion voice actors